Tirumala Tirupati Venkatesa is a 2000 Indian Telugu-language comedy film directed by Sathibabu, an assistant to E. V. V. Satyanarayana. The film is a remake of the Tamil film Thirupathi Ezhumalai Venkatesa (1999) and stars Srikanth, Ravi Teja, Bramhanandam, Roja, Maheswari and Kovai Sarala. The film was produced by Chanti Addala and Sreenivasa Reddy and released on December 21, 2000.

Plot 
Tirumala, Tirupati and Venkatesa are poor friends who want to become rich at any cost. Kota, a bungalow watchman, has three daughters: Lalitha, Padmini and Ragini. When the owner left the bungalow on vacation, Kota's daughters move into the bungalow. Afterwards, Kota rents his owner's top portion bungalow to Tirumala, Tirupati and Venkatesa who lied about their job. The three men eventually marry the three women. The rest of the story is how the three men will manage their wives.

Cast

Production 
The film's pooja was held on August 2, 2000 at Ramanaidu Studios. Principal photography commenced on September 15 and ended on October 30.

Soundtrack 
Music composed by Vandemataram Srinivas. The song "Paisa Paisa" was reused from "Aasai Aasai" from original Tamil film.
"Abbo Na Bandar Laddu" - Sukhwinder Singh, Swarnalatha, Sunitha Upadrashta
"Jhanak Jhanak" -  Udit Narayan, Anuradha Paudwal
"Nadumu Ompulo" - Rajesh Krishnan, K. S. Chithra
"One by Three" - S. P. Balasubrahmanyam
"Paisa Paisa" - S. P. Balasubrahmanyam

Release 
The film released on December 21, 2000.

Reception 
A critic from Full Hyderabad opined that "Since even this tedium is packaged with a comic touch, it is not unbearable either. It is just one of those regular run-of-the-mill comedies that we have seen before".

Controversy 
A devotee of Lord Venkateswara filed a complaint about how the film's title demeaned the god. Chanti Addala, the film's producer organized a press meet where he talked about how the film was not a devotional film but solely a film for entertainment.

References

External links 
 

2000 films
Telugu remakes of Tamil films
2000s Telugu-language films
Indian comedy films
2000 comedy films
Films directed by E. Satti Babu